The 1942 Hardin–Simmons Cowboys football team was an American football team that represented Hardin–Simmons University in the Border Conference during the 1942 college football season. The team compiled a 9–1–1 record (4–0–1 against conference opponents), tied with Texas Tech for the conference championship, lost its only game to the Second Air Force Bombers in the 1943 Sun Bowl, and outscored all opponents by a total of 254 to 71.

Warren B. Woodson was in his second season as the team's head coach. Woodson went into the United States Navy at the end of the regular season, and assistant coach Clark Jarnagin took over as interim head coach for the Sun Bowl game.

Backs Rudy Mobley and Camp Wilson led the team on offense. Mobley led the country and set a new NCAA single-season record with 1,281 rushing yards in 10 regular season games.

Schedule

References

Hardin-Simmons
Hardin–Simmons Cowboys football seasons
Border Conference football champion seasons
Hardin-Simmons Cowboys football